Grist Lake Airport  was located next to Grist Lake, Alberta, Canada.

References

External links
Place to Fly on COPA's Places to Fly airport directory

Defunct airports in Alberta